The Macintosh Way was the first book written by former Apple evangelist Guy Kawasaki. Subtitled "the art of guerrilla management", the book focused on technology marketing and management and includes many anecdotes culled from Kawasaki's experience during the early development of the Macintosh.

The author wrote of the book on his website: "This book was my first child. I wrote it because I was bursting with idealistic and pure notions about how a company can change the world, and I wanted to spread the gospel." He re-acquired rights to it after it had gone out of print and released it online as a free download.

The book features a foreword by Jean-Louis Gassée.

Chapter listing 
 First Blood
 Macintosh Days
 Environment
 Great Products
 Support
 Marketing
 User Groups
 Evangelism
 To Market, To Market
 The Printed Word
 Working with the Mothership
 How to Give Good Demo
 Presentation Manager
 Trade Show Mavenship
 How to Drive your (MS-DOS) Competitors Crazy
 The Macintosh Guide to Dating and Marriage
 Sayonara

External links 
 The Macintosh Way at Guy Kawasaki's site

1990 non-fiction books
Organizational culture
Books by computer and internet entrepreneurs
Books about Apple Inc.